Michael John Anthony Lester (born 4 August 1954) is an English former professional footballer who played as a defender/midfielder. He made 381 appearances most at Scunthorpe from 1983 to 1986 with 106 appearances.

Lester played in the North American Soccer League with the Washington Diplomats, and was involved in an altercation with Pelé during his last appearance for the New York Cosmos in Washington.

He signed for Mossley in December 1989 and retired at the end of the season having made 24 appearances.

Later became assistant manager of Runcorn and then manager of Chadderton, Atherton Laburnum Rovers, Rochdale Town and Oldham Borough.

References

External links
Mike Lester's Career

1954 births
Living people
English footballers
Footballers from Manchester
Association football midfielders
Oldham Athletic A.F.C. players
Manchester City F.C. players
Stockport County F.C. players
North American Soccer League (1968–1984) players
Washington Diplomats (NASL) players
Grimsby Town F.C. players
Barnsley F.C. players
Exeter City F.C. players
Bradford City A.F.C. players
Scunthorpe United F.C. players
Hartlepool United F.C. players
Blackpool F.C. players
Chorley F.C. players
English Football League players
English expatriate sportspeople in the United States
Expatriate soccer players in the United States
English expatriate footballers
Mossley A.F.C. players